Becoming A Popstar is an American music competition television series produced by Jesse Collins Entertainment and Velocity, it premiered on MTV on March 24, 2022. Joe Jonas, Becky G, and Sean Bankhead serves as judges for the series.

The first season concluded its run on April 21, 2022, with Samy Hawk winning.

Format
The 5-episode series features aspiring TikTok singer-songwriter contestants that create original songs and one-minute music videos. In the end, two contestants are chosen to compete in the finale and win the "popstar" title, a monetary prize of $100,000 and a feature in a Pepsi commercial, expected to air during the 2022 MTV Video Music Awards.

Contestants
Alexi Blue
Amira Daugherty
Bryan Vaulx Jr.
Kyle Morris
Lexie Hayden
Lynnea Moorer
Rachel Grae
Samy Hawk

Episodes

References

External links

 
 

2022 American television series debuts
2020s American music television series
MTV original programming
English-language television shows
Music competitions in the United States
Television shows filmed in Los Angeles